was a village located in Kitatsugaru District in western Aomori Prefecture, Japan.

Shiura was located in northwest corner of Tsugaru Peninsula facing the Sea of Japan. The area was part of Hirosaki Domain during the Edo period. After the Meiji Restoration, Shiura Village was created on March 31, 1955 through the merger of Aiuchi, Jusan and Wakimoto villages.

On March 28, 2005, Shiura, along with the neighboring town of Kanagi (also from Kitatsugaru District), was merged into the expanded city of Goshogawara, and thus no longer exists as an independent municipality.

At the time of its merger, Shiura had an estimated population of 2,708 and a population density of 24.23 persons per km2. The total area was 111.75 km2.

The village economy was dominated by commercial fishing and agriculture. The village was on Route 339 (Japan) highway.

Climate

References

Dissolved municipalities of Aomori Prefecture